The 2011 Ningbo Challenger was a professional tennis tournament played on hard courts. It was the first edition of the tournament which was part of the 2011 ATP Challenger Tour and the second edition for the 2011 ITF Women's Circuit. It took place in Ningbo, China between 12 and 18 September 2011.

ATP entrants

Seeds

 1 Rankings are as of August 29, 2011.

Other entrants
The following players received wildcards into the singles main draw:
  Wang Chuhan
  Feng He
  Ma Yanan
  Zhou Zhuoqing

The following players received entry from the qualifying draw:
  Luka Gregorc
  Christopher Rungkat
  Jose Rubin Statham
  Daniel Yoo

WTA entrants

Seeds

 1 Rankings are as of August 29, 2011.

Other entrants
The following players received wildcards into the singles main draw:
  Duan Yingying
  Liu Wanting
  Tian Ran
  Zhao Di

The following players received entry from the qualifying draw:
  Shuko Aoyama
  Hu Yueyue
  Xu Yifan
  Zhu Lin

Champions

Men's singles

 Lu Yen-hsun def.  Jürgen Zopp, 6–2, 3–6, 6–1

Women's singles

 Anastasiya Yakimova def.  Erika Sema, 7–6(7–3), 6–3

Men's doubles

 Karan Rastogi /  Divij Sharan def.  Jan Hernych /  Jürgen Zopp, 3–6, 7–6(7–3), [13–11]

Women's doubles

 Tetiana Luzhanska /  Zheng Saisai def.  Chan Chin-wei /  Han Xinyun, 6–4, 5–7, [10–4]

External links
Men's ITF Search 
Women's ITF Search 
ATP official site

Ningbo Challenger
Ningbo Challenger
Hard court tennis tournaments
2011 in Chinese tennis
Ningbo International Women's Tennis Open